In 2004 Filmzene.net was founded and is Hungary’s first and only website that exclusively deals with film music. The site is run by fans, who are passionated by their love for film music.

History  
The beginning:

In 2003 a group of film music loving friends decided that they will develop a much needed, niche, Hungarian website that would specifically focus on the film music genre, but in a way everyone can relate to. They did this, back then, because most websites which discussed films, completely or almost completely left out (one sentence here or there, many times without naming the composer) any references to and/or discussion of the film’s music, despite it being one of the indispensable ingredients to a movie. The website primarily focus’ on symphonic, electronic and other instrumental film music, but there is also write ups about many a film soundtrack.

The goals of the editors was to develop a website that is constantly updated and is a place to learn about film music and its composers and producers, in the hopes that more people will get to know and love the genre. The editors are passionate about introducing the composers to audiences. The website not only features an ever-expanding artistic biography section, but also many interviews with film music composers. In the spirit of diversity, on Filmzene.net you can find interviews with; organists, conductors, producers, record company executives, and others who may be attached to the genre in some way.

Filmzene.net is a website which is entirely nonprofit, where the editors have been consistent, who are – and where the content is – not affiliated with any film distribution company, or any other organization. The content editors do not describe themselves as film music critics, they are everyday lovers of the genre, who got into this to share their opinions, but who have found that this site has since grown past expectations. Every week the number of introductory articles grows, besides the classics they introduce many new releases, but they regularly write articles about an artist's lifetime achievements, from today's, the near past's and from the Golden Age of Cinema's talents.

From concept to today:

“December 25th 2003 - the test version of the site goes live.” This sentence could be found on the domain during the test run, which was only visible to the editors. For months, they worked on perfecting the site. During that time the design and the concept was decided upon. In the beginning of July in 2004, 23 biographies and 48 critics were uploaded to Filmzene.net. The “under construction” banner was removed and the site went live. The columns are constantly being updated and more columns were added along the way. 
Columns include film soundtracks, biographies and news and besides these articles about known film composer's non-film works and their concerts in Hungary and abroad, work done by artists close to the movie music genre, record company executives and studios, and many more.
The next step was to talk to the artists working in the music industry. Thanks to this, since the starting efforts, it was made possible that regular published interviews have become an integral part of the website, as are articles about old and new albums.
Filmzene.net has interviewed such known artists as; Brian Tyler, David Arnold, Graeme Revell, John Debney, John Ottman, John Powell, Lisa Gerrard, Mark Isham, Marvin Hamlisch, Mychael Danna, Philip Glass and Ramin Djawadi.

To date, 2017, there are 1,300 reviews, 60 interviews, and 140 biographies published on the site. There are 55 articles about the collaborations between the composers and the directors of a film, 50 about the music of movie franchises and TV shows. The Legends of Film Music column has writings about 22 composers. There are discussions about 6 studios and 13 record companies. Content also included on the site is 6 short histories of the awards given out to film music creators and the list of nominees and winners.

Interviews 

 Aaron Zigman
 Aenima CGS
 Alex Wurman
 Andrew Lockington
 Andy Vajna
 Anthony Lledo
 Asche & Spencer
 Atli Örvarsson
 Austin Wintory
 Balázs Zságer
 Brian McNelis
 Brian Tyler
 Carl Davis
 Dan Foliart
 Daniel Licht
 David Arnold
 David Julyan
 Deborah Lurie
 Edmund Choi
 Elia Cmiral
 George S. Clinton
 Graeme Revell
 Hollerung Gábor
 J. Peter Robinson
 James Dooley
 Jeff Beal
 Jeff Danna
 Jeff Rona
 John Debney
 John Frizzell
 John Hunter
 John Ottman
 John Powell
 Lisa Gerrard
 Mark Hinton Stewart
 Mark Isham
 Marvin Hamlisch
 Mateo Messina
 Matteo Zingales
 Michael V. Gerhard
 Mychael Danna
 Nathan Barr
 Paul Leonard-Morgan
 Pedro Bromfman
 Péter Wolf
 Philip Glass
 Ramin Djawadi
 Richard Marvin
 Róbert Gulya
 Robert Townson
 Robin Esterhammer
 Roque Banos
 Starr Parodi
 Timothy Williams
 Tina Guo
 Varnus Xavér
 Víctor Reyes

The Legends of Film Music 

 Alex North
 Alfred Newman
 Angelo Badalamenti
 Basil Poledouris
 Bernard Herrmann
 Dave Grusin
 David Raksin
 Dimitri Tiomkin
 Erich Wolfgang Korngold
 Franz Waxman
 Georges Delerue
 John Barry
 Lalo Schifrin
 Leonard Rosenman
 Marvin Hamlisch
 Maurice Jarre
 Max Steiner
 Michel Legrand
 Nino Rota
 Philip Glass
 Rózsa Miklós
 Victor Young

Composers, Directors, Collaborations 

 Alan Menken & the Walt Disney Studios
 Alfred Hitchcock
 Brian De Palma
 David Cronenberg & Howard Shore
 David Fincher
 David Lean & Maurice Jarre
 Elmer Bernstein
 Jack Ryan Adaptations
 James Cameron
 Jan De Bont & Mark Mancina
 Jerry Goldsmith
 Joe Dante & Jerry Goldsmith
 John Milius & Basil Poledouris
 John Powell's Scores for Animation Movies
 John Williams - Beyond the Scores
 John Williams - Away from Spielberg
 Jon Amiel & Christopher Young
 Julie Taymor & Elliot Goldenthal
 Kenneth Branagh & Patrick Doyle
 M. Night Shyamalan & James Newton Howard
 Martin Scorsese
 Michael Bay
 Michael Kamen
 Miklos Rozsa
 Oliver Stone
 Randy Newman & the Pixar Animation Studios
 Richard Donner
 Ridley Scott
 Ridley Scott & Hans Zimmer
 Robert Zemeckis & Alan Silvestri
 Roland Emmerich & David Arnold
 Roland Emmerich & Harald Kloser
 Scores for Christmas Movies
 The Scores for the Pixar Animation Studios
 Scores for Romantic Movies
 Ron Howard
 Ron Howard & James Horner
 Sergio Leone & Ennio Morricone
 Scores for Sport Movies
 Stephen King Adaptations
 Stephen Sommers
 Steven Spielberg & John Williams
 Tim Burton & Danny Elfman
 Tony Scott & Harry Gregson-Williams
 Wolfgang Petersen

Movie & Television Series 

 A Nightmare on Elm Street Movies
 Alien Movies
 Back to the Future Trilogy
 Batman Movies
 Battlestar Galactica TV Series
 Chicago Fire TV Series
 Chicago Hope TV Series
 Cold Case TV Series
 Dexter TV Series
 Die Hard Movies
 Fantastic Four Movie Series
 Final Destination TV Series
 Hannibal Movies 
 Harry Potter Movies
 Hellraiser Movies
 Jason Bourne Movies 
 Jurassic Park Movies
 Knight Rider TV series
 Lethal Weapon Movies
 Lost TV Series
 Mad Max Movies
 Masada TV Mini-Series
 Mission: Impossible Movies
 Pirates of the Caribbean Series
 Planet of the Apes Movies
 Predator Movies
 Rambo Movies
 Robert Langdon Movies
 RoboCop Movies
 Rush Hour Movies
 Scream Movies
 Spartacus TV Series
 Species Movies
 Spider-Man Movies
 Star Wars Saga
 Strike Back TV Series
 Superman Movies
 Terminator Movies
 Terra Nova TV Series
 The Avengers Movies
 The Expendables Movie Series
 The Hobbit Trilogy
 The Mummy Movies
 The Tudors TV Series
 The X-Files TV Series
 Tom & Jerry Animation Movies
 Transformers Movies
 True Justice TV Series
 Twilight Saga TV Series
 X-Men Movies

Scores for Same Subject 
 Conan
 Hollywood and the Presidents of the USA
 Jane Eyre adaptations
 Robin Hood
 Shark Movies
 Sherlock Holmes
 The Three Musketeers

References

External links 
 Official website
 Interviews (in English)

Hungarian music websites